Ziras Parish is an administrative unit of the Ventspils Municipality, Latvia.The parish has a population of 543 (as of 1/07/2010) and covers an area of 153.80 km2.

History 
In the territory of modern Ziras  parish there were historically Vendzava manor (Gut Wensau, Vendzavas) and Ziru manor (Gut Sirgen, Ziras).
In 1935, the area of Ziras  Parish in Ventspils District was 90 km² and there were 1227 inhabitants. In 1945, Sise  and Zira village councils were established in the parish, but in 1949 the parish was liquidated. The liquidated village of Sises was added to Ziru village in 1954. In 1990, the village was reorganized into a parish. In 2009, Ziras parish was included as an administrative territory in Ventspils Municipality.

Villages of Ziras Parish 
 
 
 
 
  (parish center)

See also 
 Užava lowland

References

External links 
 Ziras parish in Latvian

Parishes of Latvia
Ventspils Municipality